Spilarctia owgarra is a moth in the family of Erebidae. It was first described by George Thomas Bethune-Baker in 1908 in New Guinea. The habitat consists of mountainous areas.

Subspecies
Spilarctia owgarra owgarra (Papua, western and south-eastern Papua New Guinea)
Spilarctia owgarra germanica (Rothschild, 1910) (north-eastern Papua New Guinea)

References

Moths described in 1908
owgarra